Suburban Primitive is the ninth and final studio album by garage rock band The Original Sins, which was released in 1997 through Blood Red Vinyl & Discs. The album features the return of Dave Ferrara, the band's original drummer. The album was released on 10" vinyl and CD formats. The photograph shown on the front cover was provided by John Terlesky's parents.

The band broke up in 1998, only a couple of months after the album's release.
According to an interview with Terlesky, Ken Bussiere moved to Florida to play in oldies cover bands, Seth Baer left for school, and Dan McKinney opened his very own recording studio.

Track listing

Personnel
John Terlesky - Vocals, guitar
Ken Bussiere - Bass
Dan McKinney - Keyboards, recording
Dave Ferrara - Drums
Corey Larkin - Background vocals
Jim Shirock - Backing vocals
Stacy Shirock - Backing vocals
Kenn Micheal - Photography

References

External links
 

1997 albums
The Original Sins albums